United Nations Security Council resolution 1043, adopted unanimously on 31 January 1996, after recalling previous resolutions on Croatia including Resolution 1037 (1996) which established the United Nations Transitional Authority for Eastern Slavonia, Baranja and Western Sirmium (UNTAES), the Council authorised the deployment of 100 military observers for an initial period of six months. On 26 January the Secretary General informed the Security Council that the UNTAES mission will need the observers to supervise demilitarization of Eastern Slavonia.

See also
 Bosnian War
 Breakup of Yugoslavia
 Croatian War of Independence
 List of United Nations Security Council Resolutions 1001 to 1100 (1995–1997)
 Yugoslav Wars
 United Nations Transitional Authority for Eastern Slavonia, Baranja and Western Sirmium
 Eastern Slavonia, Baranja and Western Syrmia
 Joint Council of Municipalities

References

External links
 
Text of the Resolution at undocs.org

 1043
 1043
1996 in Yugoslavia
1996 in Croatia
 1043
Joint Council of Municipalities
January 1996 events